The following is the filmography of American actor, voice actor, and singer Judge Reinhold.

Film

Television

Video games

References

External links
 

Reinhold, Judge
Reinhold, Judge
Reinhold, Judge